Nomada succincta is a species of bee in the family Apidae. It is known commonly as the yellow-legged nomad-bee.

This species is often confused with Nomada goodeniana and the two names may be listed as synonyms. Molecular analysis confirms that they are separate species.

Gallery

References

Nomadinae
Insects described in 1798